Alan Dugdale (born 11 September 1952 in Liverpool) is an English retired professional football central defender. He spent most of his career in England with one season in the North American Soccer League.

In 1969, Dugdale began his career with Coventry City. In 1970, he was part of the Coventry City youth team which lost the championship to Tottenham Hotspur. Dugdale did not break into the first team until 1974 and transferred to Charlton Athletic in October 1977 for £ 50,000. In the fall of 1979, he signed with the Tulsa Roughnecks as it prepared for the 1979–1980 North American Soccer League indoor season. He then played the entire 1980 and six games of the 1981 outdoor seasons. His uncle Jimmy Dugdale had an extensive career in the Football League., while his brother Ken Dugdale was manager of the New Zealand national team.

References

External links

Tulsa Roughnecks Stats
Alan Dugdale

1952 births
Living people
Barnsley F.C. players
Charlton Athletic F.C. players
Coventry City F.C. players
English footballers
English expatriate footballers
North American Soccer League (1968–1984) indoor players
North American Soccer League (1968–1984) players
Tulsa Roughnecks (1978–1984) players
Association football forwards
English expatriate sportspeople in the United States
Expatriate soccer players in the United States